The National Office for Veterans and Victims of War ( (ONACVG) ) is a French governmental agency under the Ministry of the Armed Forces. Its purpose is recognition and support of the nation's war veterans and victims, and directing national policy about war memorials and remembrances.

The current agency is the successor to the veteran's organisation first set up in 1916 during the First World War. It underwent several mergers with related veterans and war victims organisations. Its charter was expanded to include victims of terrorist incidents following the November 2015 Paris attacks.

History 

The first office to be created was the National Office of Disabled and Discharged War Veterans created by ministerial decree on 2 March 1916, during the First World War. At the outset the latter was an interagency autonomous public institution managed by a Board of Directors. During the years 1933 and 1934, successive mergers of the three organisations created the National Office of Veterans, Disabled, War Victims, and Wards of the Nation. In 1946 this organisation took over the management of social services of the Ministry of Prisoners, Deportees and Refugees and was renamed the National Office of Veterans and Victims of War. Since 1991, it also handles assistance to victims of terrorism.

Goals and responsibilities 

The Office has three goalsː

 Recognition on behalf of the Nation towards people affected by the war. It allocates recognition of their status and to the entitlements that go along with it via local services, id cards, and documents.
 Social action, as expressed by administrative assistance, by implementation of the status of Ward of the Nation by financing the cost of professional retraining, and by assistance for French citizens living abroad.
 Operation of the policy of memorials and historical preservation developed by the Armed Forces.  The actions of the Office are geared towards celebrating, sharing, and conveying the memory of contemporary conflicts and the values of the Republic.

It carries out these goals by handling applications, assigning honors, and disbursing allocations according to the rights established by the law, including handling applications and requests for
 veterans id cards, and for other statuses such as victimes of war 
 certificates of the Nation's gratitude, and honors such as MPF (Died For France) and MED
 reimbursement for trips to gravesites and sites of crimes related to deportation
as well as disbursing funds owed to constituents via departmental branches, as part of reparations for
 awarding veterans' pensions
 gratitude to Harkis and their widows
 management of the veterans disability card
 managing policy regarding benefits to orphans of deportation and victims of antisemitic persecution.

Operation 

The agency is constituted as a legal person (établissement public à caractère administratif) with financial autonomy. It maintains delegates in every French department.

It has a board of directors whose role it is to define institutional policy. The board chair is appointed by the Council of Ministers.  The board consists of 40 members divided into four colleges. The first one has eight members representing the assemblies and the administrations to which they belong and serve for four years. The second college has 2 members and represents veterans and war victims selected from among the different citizen categories. The third college consists of six members representing the foundations and national associations that work for memorials and citizenship. It is chaired by the Minister Delegate for Veterans Affairs. Finally the council includes two representatives from the staff of the national office.

See also 

 Bleuet de France
 Military history of France
 France in World War I
 France in World War II

References 
Notes

References

External links 

 Official website (in French)
 ONACVG, from French consulate, Boston (in English)

Commemoration
French Army
Military of France
Military history of France
1916 establishments in France